The 1984–85 Midland Football Combination season was the 48th in the history of Midland Football Combination, a football competition in England.

Premier Division

The Premier Division featured 18 clubs which competed in the division last season along with two new clubs, promoted from Division One:
New World
Polesworth North Warwick

League table

References

1984–85
8